Michael Allen Broadway (born March 30, 1987) is an American professional baseball pitcher who is a free agent. He has played in Major League Baseball (MLB) for the San Francisco Giants and in Nippon Professional Baseball (NPB) for the Yokohama DeNA BayStars.

Career

Atlanta Braves
Broadway was drafted by the Atlanta Braves in the fourth round of the 2005 Major League Baseball Draft out of Pope County High School in Golconda, Illinois. He made his professional debut with the GCL Braves. In 2006, Broadway played for the rookie ball Danville Braves, recording a 4–0 record and 3.25 ERA. The next year, he played for the Single-A Rome Braves, registering an 11–6 record and 5.25 ERA in 29 appearances. He played the 2008 season split between Rome and the High-A Myrtle Beach Pelicans, accumulating a 4.01 ERA and 2–5 record through 37 games. In 2009, he split the year between Myrtle Beach and the Double-A Mississippi Braves, pitching to a 2–7 record and 3.90 ERA with 57 strikeouts in 39 games. In 2010, Broadway split the year between Mississippi and the Triple-A Gwinnett Braves, posting a 5–1 record and 4.39 ERA in 53.1 innings of work between the two teams. In 2011, Broadway returned to Mississippi, where he recorded a 1.80 ERA in 4 games, missing most of the season with injury. On November 2, 2011, he elected free agency.

San Diego Padres
On May 28, 2012, Broadway signed a minor league contract with the San Diego Padres organization. He spent the season with the Double-A San Antonio Missions, pitching to a 6.35 ERA with 45 strikeouts in 33 appearances. On March 31, 2013, Broadway was released by the Padres.

Washington Nationals
On April 1, 2013, Broadway signed a minor league contract with the Washington Nationals organization. He split the season between the Double-A Harrisburg Senators and the Triple-A Syracuse Chiefs, posting a 2.45 ERA with 40 strikeouts in 40.1 innings of work. On November 4, 2013, Broadway elected free agency.

San Francisco Giants
On January 24, 2014, Broadway signed a minor league contract with the San Francisco Giants. He was assigned to the Triple-A Fresno Grizzlies to begin the year, but missed most of the season due to injury. In 3 games for Fresno and 5 rehab games with the AZL Giants, Broadway registered a 4.50 ERA with 11 strikeouts. On January 8, 2015, Broadway re-signed with the Giants on a new minor league contract. He was assigned to the Triple-A Sacramento River Cats to begin the season, with whom he recorded an excellent 0.93 ERA with 13 saves in 40 appearances.

Broadway was called up to the majors for the first time on June 12, 2015. He made his major league debut the following day against the Arizona Diamondbacks, pitching one scoreless inning with one strikeout. Broadway was optioned to Triple-A Sacramento on June 23 but was recalled on June 26. He was optioned back to Sacramento on July 3. In 21 major league appearances, Broadway pitched to a 5.19 ERA with 13 strikeouts.

Broadway started the 2016 season with the Triple-A Sacramento River Cats. He was called up on April 19 to replace the injured George Kontos.  On April 29, Broadway yielded six runs as part of a 12-run third inning against the New York Mets, and was optioned back to Sacramento the following day. He was designated for assignment on July 4, 2016, after struggling to an 11.81 ERA across 4 appearances. On July 11, Broadway was released by the Giants organization.

Yokohama DeNA BayStars
On July 14, 2016, Broadway signed a one-year, $570,000 contract with the Yokohama DeNA BayStars of Nippon Professional Baseball. Broadway made 5 appearances for Yokohama in 2016, pitching to a 4.50 ERA with 3 strikeouts. He became a free agent after the year.

Washington Nationals (second stint)
On December 13, 2016, Broadway signed a minor league contract with the Washington Nationals organization that included an invitation to Spring Training. He was assigned to the Triple-A Syracuse Chiefs out of spring, but was released on May 31, 2017, after struggling to a 10.38 ERA in 13 games with Syracuse.

Tampa Bay Rays
On June 22, 2017, Broadway signed a minor league deal with the Tampa Bay Rays organization. He split the remainder of the season between the Double-A Montgomery Biscuits and the Triple-A Durham Bulls, striking out 28 in 32.0 innings of work. On November 6, 2017, he elected free agency.

Kansas City Royals
On December 14, 2017, Broadway signed a minor league contract with the Kansas City Royals. He began the season with the Triple-A Omaha Storm Chasers, but struggled to a 7.91 ERA across 20 appearances and was released on June 18, 2018.

Tampa Bay Rays (second stint)
On June 30, 2018, Broadway signed a minor league deal with the Tampa Bay Rays. He finished the season with the Double-A Montgomery Biscuits, registering a 3.60 ERA in 22 games. He elected free agency on November 2, 2018.

Somerset Patriots
On March 21, 2019, Broadway signed with the Somerset Patriots of the Atlantic League of Professional Baseball. Broadway recorded a 2.84 ERA in 31 games before he announced his retirement on July 19, 2019.

West Virginia Power
On May 28, 2021, Broadway came out of retirement to sign with the West Virginia Power of the Atlantic League of Professional Baseball. In 10 games for the Power, Broadway recorded a stellar 1.42 ERA before being released on June 22.

Leones de Yucatán
On June 25, 2021, Broadway signed with the Leones de Yucatán of the Mexican League. In 11 games with Yucatán, Broadway pitched to a 3.86 ERA with 8 strikeouts.

West Virginia Power (second stint)
On July 25, 2021, Broadway re-signed with the West Virginia Power of the Atlantic League of Professional Baseball. He became a free agent following the season.

References

External links

1987 births
Living people
American expatriate baseball players in Japan
Arizona League Giants players
Baseball players from Kentucky
Cardenales de Lara players
American expatriate baseball players in Venezuela
Charros de Jalisco players
Danville Braves players
Durham Bulls players
Fresno Grizzlies players
Gulf Coast Braves players
Gwinnett Braves players
Harrisburg Senators players
Honolulu Sharks players
Major League Baseball pitchers
Mississippi Braves players
Montgomery Biscuits players
Myrtle Beach Pelicans players
Nippon Professional Baseball pitchers
Phoenix Desert Dogs players
Rome Braves players
Sacramento River Cats players
San Antonio Missions players
San Francisco Giants players
Somerset Patriots players
Sportspeople from Paducah, Kentucky
Syracuse Chiefs players
West Virginia Power players
Yokohama DeNA BayStars players